Terminal Station was the larger of two principal train stations in downtown Atlanta, Union Station being the other.  Opening in 1905, Terminal Station served Southern Railway, Seaboard Air Line, Central of Georgia (including the Nancy Hanks to Savannah), and the Atlanta and West Point. The architect was P. Thornton Marye, whose firm also designed the Fox Theater and Capital City Club in downtown Atlanta, as well as the Birmingham Terminal Station.

At the station's opening in 1905 the military band of the 16th Infantry Regiment played "Down in Dixie" according to a report that appeared in the Atlanta Journal. On May 21, 1910, a statue of Samuel Spencer, who had served as the first president of Southern Railway, was dedicated at the station, where it would remain until the station's closing.

In its 20th century heyday, Terminal Station was used by such well-known trains of the time as the Crescent, Man 'o War, Nancy Hanks, Ponce de Leon, and Silver Comet. A veritable rail-travel crossroads of the American south-east, it was a critical railroad link between the warm climate of Florida and the Gulf Coast, and the rather colder, more densely populated states of the north-east and mid-west. For many residents of the Northeast, Terminal Station was the gateway to the sunshine.  The Atlanta Convention Bureau released a postcard in the 1920s that claimed that Terminal Station was served by 86 trains per day.

The train shed that had originally been built alongside the head house was torn down in 1925.  The Southern Railway built an office building next door to the station at 99 Spring Street that is still standing, although the Southern eventually moved their local offices to another building in Atlanta.  On 17 May 1938 a five-story Terminal Hotel, that had been built across the street from Terminal Station, burned in a disaster that claimed 27 lives.  

The station head house was renovated in 1947 just after World War II.

After Terminal Station closed in June 1970, Southern continued to operate its Southern Crescent and Piedmont passenger trains using the much smaller Peachtree Station, commonly known as Brookwood Station and built as a suburban station, as their only stop in Atlanta. The only other passenger train remaining at that time that had been using Terminal Station, the Nancy Hanks, used a makeshift ticket office and waiting room in the Southern office building next door.

Terminal Station was razed in 1972, and the Richard B. Russell Federal Building, built in 1979, currently occupies the site.

The last remains of the station were an interlocking tower and a portion of one of the station platforms retained by the Southern, the former demolished in June, 2018, and the latter demolished November, 2019.

Major trains
Atlanta & West Point; and Southern Railway
Crescent: New York - New Orleans
Central of Georgia Railway
Man O'War: Atlanta - Columbus
Nancy Hanks: Atlanta - Savannah
Southland: Chicago- St. Petersburg, Sarasota and Miami
Seaboard Air Line (Seaboard Coast Line after 1967)
Cotton Blossom: New York - Birmingham
Passenger Mail and Express: Washington and Portsmouth - Birmingham
Silver Comet: New York and Portsmouth - Birmingham
Southern Railway
Florida Sunbeam (winter only): Chicago, Detroit and Cleveland - Miami
Kansas City–Florida Special: Kansas City - Jacksonville
New Yorker: New York - Atlanta
Peach Queen: New York - Atlanta, with through sleepers continuing west to Shreveport on the Southwestern Limited
Piedmont Limited: New York - Atlanta
Ponce de Leon: Cincinnati - Miami and St. Petersburg
Royal Palm: Cincinnati - Jacksonville
Southerner: New York - Birmingham
Sunnyland: Atlanta - Birmingham
Washington-Atlanta-New Orleans Express

See also
Atlanta Union Station (1930)

References

Bibliography

External links
 

Former Southern Railway (U.S.) stations
Former railway stations in Georgia (U.S. state)
Railway stations in Atlanta
Railway stations in Georgia (U.S. state)
Union stations in the United States
Railway stations in the United States opened in 1905
Railway stations closed in 1970
Seaboard Air Line Railroad stations
Atlanta
Demolished railway stations in the United States
Buildings and structures demolished in 1972
Demolished buildings and structures in Atlanta